Alain Dansereau (born 13 December 1954) is a Canadian fencer. He competed in the individual and team épée events at the 1976 Summer Olympics.

References

1954 births
Living people
Canadian male fencers
Olympic fencers of Canada
Fencers at the 1976 Summer Olympics
Fencers from Montreal